7th Avenue, also known as Melrose District for the historic neighborhood, is a station on the Metro light rail line in Phoenix, Arizona, United States.

Notable places nearby
 Valley Lutheran High School

Ridership

References

External links
 Valley Metro map

Valley Metro Rail stations in Phoenix, Arizona
Railway stations in the United States opened in 2008
2008 establishments in Arizona